Allandale Waterfront GO Station was built just south of Allandale Station, a historic train station that occupies a large property on the southern shore of Lake Simcoe in the waterfront area of Barrie, Ontario, Canada. The current station and former station were built on a burial site of the Huron indigenous peoples.

Construction of the new facility began in 2009. GO Transit announced on 15 June 2011 that the station would open in the autumn of 2011, but construction delayed its opening until January 2012. Bus service to the station began on 28 January 2012, with the train service following two days later. A ceremonial train trip from Allandale Waterfront GO Station to Bradford GO Station officially opened the station on 29 January 2012.

History

Early years
The Ontario, Simcoe and Huron Union Railway (OS&HUR) first built a station here in 1853. The current structure, the fourth station building on the site, was designed by the architectural firm Spier and Rohns, built in 1904 by Richard Scruton, and opened by then-operator Grand Trunk Railway on 19 June 1905. The station provided passenger service for the Grand Trunk and later the Canadian National Railway and Via Rail until closing in 1980. It briefly reopened as a GO passenger facility from 1990 to 1993. In 1996, the CNR lifted rails between Allandale and Longford.

ACDC
The Allandale Community Development Corporation or 'ACDC' (with City interests) purchased the buildings and adjacent  from CNR after train service was discontinued in the 1980s. ACDC then sold the station to CHUM Ltd in 2000.

CHUM ownership
CHUM planned to restore the Allandale Station building as part of their plan to develop of a new broadcast centre on the site for their television station, CKVR, but changed their plan in 2004. In 2007, CHUM agreed to sell the property to the City for the same amount CHUM originally paid. CHUM received a Charitable Donation tax receipt reflecting the increased value of the property since 2000 largely due to the restoration and site works completed by CHUM.

Redevelopment
Construction of the new Allandale Waterfront GO Station (located adjacent to the historic Allandale Station) broke ground in spring 2010 and the station officially opened on 28 January 2012. Redevelopment of the station cost approximately $5 million.

Archeology
The Allandale station site is located on a site used by indigenous peoples. Prior to the original railway construction, a large pit of several hundred indigenous peoples' remains was found. Other ossuaries were found in 1884 and 1889.

It was the subject of an archeological excavation, during which objects were recovered from the Uren substage of the Middle Ontario Iroquoian period. It has been dated to the late 12th to early 13th century and was used as a fishing station by the Huron people. It is the only documented fishing station from the Uren period, and one of few sites of that period to have been discovered.

The site is regarded by archeologists as a temporary location "for exploitation of local fish resources". Numerous fish remains were found in the site's midden, but no longhouses were found there.

Analysis of the fish remains indicates that various species were caught for consumption at this site. These include species in the family Catostomidae (110 white sucker, 23 longnose sucker, and 103 specimens from other genus Catostomus species), family Percidae (34 yellow perch and 1 walleye), as well as 12 Ictaluridae, 14 largemouth bass and 4 smallmouth bass, 5 Centrarchidae, and specimens from several other species.

In 2011, human bone fragment remains were discovered underneath the crawl space of the office building at the site during an excavation for an archeological site assessment as part of grading work for the new train station. These were later determined to have been in the fill used as backfill for the foundation, but were of indeterminate origin. An incisor found amongst those remains was interpreted to be part of the Uren archeological material, but data are insufficient to ascertain its ultimate origin.

The Huron-Wendat people consider the site to be a disturbed site of indigenous remains which could be an ossuary. The original train station and yard's construction disturbed the remains and the new station disturbed them further without proper archaeological study. Further, the construction of the GO station did not follow Government of Ontario heritage regulations, which prohibited the disturbance of human remains at a known site.

Heritage station buildings
The station buildings comprise a federally designated heritage railway station protected by the Heritage Railway Stations Protection Act. The Italianate structures are near the southwest shore of Kempenfeldt Bay in Lake Simcoe, separated from it by a public park. The station complex was originally adjacent to Kempenfeldt Bay until the land behind the station was infilled and levelled to build a rail yard.

The station complex consists of a station building, an office building, and a restaurant adjacent to each other along the rail line. They have a uniform roof pitch, and form an atypical layout for a railway station. The low-pitched roof and deep overhanging eaves are indicative of Prairie School design influence. Two of the buildings were designed in 1904 by the Detroit firm Spier & Rohns.

The interior and exterior features of the buildings are provincially protected under an Ontario Heritage Trust conservation easement. The station building was considered the "flagship of the Grand Trunk" upon its opening.

Services
Allandale Waterfront station has weekday train service consisting of 7 trains southbound to Union Station in the morning, and 7 trains returning northbound from Union Station in the afternoon.  At other times, GO bus route 68 operates hourly to Aurora GO Station where passengers can transfer to the all-day train service to Toronto.

Weekend train service consists of 5 trains in each direction throughout the day.  GO bus route 68 also operates hourly to Aurora GO station or East Gwillimbury GO station where passengers can connect to the hourly weekend train service to Toronto.

Simcoe County LINX bus service from Wasaga Beach uses this station. Other intercity services using Barrie Bus Terminal are expected to move to Allandale Waterfront GO in 2023.

References

External links

Allandale Station Lands at City of Barrie

Buildings and structures in Barrie
Rail transport in Barrie
GO Transit railway stations
Railway stations in Canada opened in 2012
Canadian National Railway stations in Ontario
Designated heritage railway stations in Ontario
Railway stations in Simcoe County
2012 establishments in Ontario